András Littay (15 August 1884 Szabadka (Subotica), Austria-Hungary – 21 July 1967 Melbourne, Australia) was a Hungarian General during World War II. He was professor at the Budapest Military Academy and Commander of the VII Army Corps, the Deputy Minister of Defence, the Royal Hungarian Privy Councilor, a member of the Order of Vitéz.

Although a member of Hungarian military cooperating with Nazi Germany, he did not make any step on conflicts on the war.

1884 births
1967 deaths
People from Subotica
Hungarians in Vojvodina
Hungarian generals
Hungarian soldiers
Austro-Hungarian military personnel of World War I
Hungarian military personnel of World War II
Hungarian emigrants to Australia